Gujar Khan Tehsil, 
headquartered at Gujar Khan, is one of the seven Tehsils (sub-divisions) of Rawalpindi District in the Punjab province of Pakistan. It is administratively subdivided into 36 Union Councils and according to the 1998 census has a population of 42,0000. In 2017 census Gujar Khan has a population of 678,503

History
The tehsil of Gujar Khan was described in the Imperial Gazetteer of India, compiled during the first decade of the twentieth century, as follows:

"Southern tahsil of Rawalpindi District, Punjab, lying between 33°4′ and 33°26′ N. and 72°56′ and 73°37′ E., with an area of 567 square miles. It is bounded on the east by the Jhelum river, which cuts it off from Kashmir territory. Except for a low ridge of sandstone hills along the Jhelum, the tahsil consists of a plain intersected by numerous ravines. The population in 1901 was 150,566, compared with 152,455 in 1891. It contains 381 villages, of which Gujar Khan is the headquarters. The land revenue and cesses in 1903-4 amounted to 2-7 lakhs."

During the period of British rule, Gujar Khan Tehsil increased in population and importance.  The predominantly Muslim population supported Muslim League and Pakistan Movement. After the independence of Pakistan in 1947, the minority Hindus and Sikhs migrated to India while the Muslims refugees from India settled down in the Rawalpindi District.

Administration

The tehsil of Gujar Khan is administratively subdivided into 36 Union Councils, these are:
 Bewal
 Noor Dolal
 Bhadana
 Changa Bangial
 Changa Maira
 Daultala
 Devi, Punjab
 Gujar Khan-I
 Gujar Khan-II
 Gujar Khan-III
 Gulyana
 Gungrila
 Jand Mehlo
 Jarmot Kalan
 Jatli
 Jhungle
 Kalyam Awan
 Kaniat Khalil
 Karumb Ilyas
 Kauntrila
 Kuri Dolal
 Mandrah
 Manghot
 Mankiala Branmma
 Matwa
 Mohra Noori
 Narali
 Punjgran Kalan
 Qazian
 Raman
 Sahang
 Sui Cheemian
 Sukho
 Syed Kasran
 Thathi
 Islampura Jabbar

See also
 List of Union Councils of Gujar Khan Tehsil

References 

 
Tehsils of Rawalpindi District